Pinchas Eliezer "Pini" Dunner  (born September 25, 1970) is a British Orthodox rabbi based in California.

Early life
Dunner was born in London, UK. His father, Aba Dunner (1937-2011), was a prominent Jewish community activist, renowned for his work on behalf of European Jewry. His grandfather, Rabbi Josef Hirsch Dunner (1913-2007), was the last Chief Rabbi of East Prussia before World War II, and later presiding Rabbi of the Union of Orthodox Hebrew Congregations in London, where he led the strictly orthodox community for over 50 years.

Dunner spent his early years in the North London neighborhood of Stamford Hill. In 1976 his family moved to Golders Green, a suburb in North West London with a large Jewish community.

After high school Dunner attended rabbinical seminaries in Gateshead Talmudical College,
 Baltimore, and Yeshiva Mercaz Hatorah in Jerusalem. In 1992 he was ordained as a rabbi by Beth Medrash Govoha, the largest Orthodox postgraduate rabbinical seminary in the United States. That same year Dunner was accepted into the Jewish History honors program at University College London. He graduated in 1996.

Personal life
Dunner is married to Sabine, née Ackerman, and they have six children. He is known for his extensive collection of Jewish controversy-related items, including books, periodicals, and manuscripts. He also began a series of online lectures about his collection at the beginning of the Covid-19 pandemic.

Career
In the winter of 1991 Dunner moved to Moscow where he served as the assistant rabbi at Moscow Choral Synagogue.

In 1996 Dunner took over the failing daily Jewish radio program broadcast by Spectrum Radio, a multi-ethnic radio station based in Battersea, London. Under his direction, the two-hour daily radio show became known for interviews with leading British and Israeli politicians, as well as for detailed news reports from Israel and the Jewish world.

In 1998 Dunner was invited by a group of philanthropists to set up and lead a trailblazing synagogue, called the Saatchi Synagogue, in Maida Vale, West London. “The Saatchi”, as it became known, quickly became a magnet for single postgraduate professional Jews wishing to meet each other in a friendly, non-coercive environment, although the unorthodox nature of its promotion techniques and social events resulted in criticism from the conservative British Jewish establishment.

In 2002, Dunner appeared on the popular BBC television motoring series Top Gear, coming fifth in the first-ever "Fastest Faith" competition.

In 2004, Dunner left Saatchi Synagogue and joined his family’s real estate business.

In 2019, Dunner authored a book, "Mavericks, Mystics and False Messiahs," which was nominated as a finalist for the National Jewish Book Award.

California
In the Summer of 2011 Dunner was approached to take up a senior faculty position at Yeshiva University High Schools of Los Angeles (YULA). Dunner moved with his family to the Pico-Robertson district of Los Angeles, where his home became a magnet for teenagers and young adults eager to enhance their Jewish experience.

In March 2013, the American Israel Public Affairs Committee (AIPAC) recognized the pro-Israel activism of Rabbi Dunner, presenting him with the ‘Ally of the Year’ award for being "a shining example of what a campus professional can mean to an entire school." In their press release, AIPAC stated: "[Rabbi Dunner's] profound contribution to the creation of an environment on campus where students are excited to be involved in pro-Israel political activism has led activists at YULA to be some of the most productive in the country." 

After two years at YULA, Dunner was appointed senior rabbi at Young Israel of North Beverly Hills, also known as Beverly Hills Synagogue,
a modern Orthodox Jewish community in the heart of Beverly Hills, where he and his family now reside.

On June 12, 2019, Dunner was presented with the Algemeiner Honoree Award at the inaugural West Coast Algemeiner Gala.

On June 17, 2021, Dunner was presented with the YINBH Hechaver Award for exemplary leadership of his community during the COVID-19 pandemic, at the annual Beverly Hills Synagogue Gala Banquet.

On June 8, 2022, Dunner, along with Dennis Prager, an American talk-show host, debated at the Saban Theatre, Beverly Hills, about the inherence of good moral character and goodness in humans.

Agunot
In 1999, Dunner launched a public campaign against the phenomenon of Jewish husbands refusing to give their wives a Jewish document of divorce, known as a "Get", thereby preventing them from remarrying within the Jewish community, a status referred to as "Agunah".

Publications 

As Author

 Mavericks, Mystics & False Messiahs: Episodes from the Margins of Jewish History (Koren, 2018) 
 Hearts & Minds: An Original Look at Each Parsha in the Torah (Otzrot, 2021)

References

External links
Beverly Hills Synagogue Website
Official website

1970 births
Agunot
British Jews
Living people
People from Stamford Hill
British emigrants to the United States
American people of British-Jewish descent
American people of German-Jewish descent